Felix Klaus (born 13 September 1992) is a German professional footballer who plays as a winger for  club Fortuna Düsseldorf.

Club career

Greuther Fürth

Klaus started his professional career with SpVgg Greuther Fürth, making his debut in the 2010–11 2. Bundesliga season. At the end of the season, he was voted by the fans as "Player of the Season", with his side being promoted to Bundesliga. On 31 August 2012, he scored the first ever Bundesliga goal of Greuther Fürth in a victory against 1. FSV Mainz 05.

SC Freiburg
On 20 May 2013, Klaus switched to SC Freiburg. Upon his arrival at the club, the club's sports director commented "With Felix Klaus we win a variably deployable offensive player who has already proven his talent in the Bundesliga". On 3 October, he made his debut for the club in a 2–0 defeat against Sevilla FC in the UEFA Europa League. On 25 January 2014, he scored a goal in the dying minutes of a 3–2 league victory against Bayer Leverkusen; as a result of which the club came out of the relegation zone. He went on to collect more than 50 caps during his stay at the club.

Hannover 96
On 30 June 2015, Klaus joined Hannover 96 from freshly relegated SC Freiburg and signed a four-year contract. On 9 August, he made his debut for the club in a 2–0 victory against KSV Hessen Kassel in the DFB Pokal; and provided an assist to Salif Sané. On 24 October, he scored his first goal for the club in a 2–1 defeat against Eintracht Frankfurt.

VfL Wolfsburg
On 31 January 2018, it was announced that Klaus would join VfL Wolfsburg in the summer transfer window. However, at the pre-season, he suffered a stomach muscle injury, and in August it was announced that he would undergo an operation. On 12 August, he underwent an operation in Berlin and later wrote on Instagram that everything was fine with him.

Loan to Fortuna Düsseldorf 
On 14 January 2021, Klaus joined Fortuna Düsseldorf on a loan deal until the end of the season.

International career
Klaus has been capped at the youth international level. He went on to represent the Germany under-21 team at the 2015 UEFA European Under-21 Championship.

Personal life
Although Klaus was born in Osnabrück, he moved to Franconia at the age of 5. His father Fred Klaus is a retired footballer and a current coach.

Career statistics

Club

References

External links
 

1992 births
Living people
Sportspeople from Osnabrück
Footballers from Lower Saxony
German footballers
Association football midfielders
Germany youth international footballers
Germany under-21 international footballers
SpVgg Greuther Fürth players
SC Freiburg players
Hannover 96 players
VfL Wolfsburg players
Fortuna Düsseldorf players
Bundesliga players
2. Bundesliga players